Carrigans may refer to one of these places in Ulster:

Carrigans, County Armagh, a  townland in County Armagh.
Carrigans, County Donegal, a village in County Donegal.
Carrigans, County Fermanagh, a townland in County Fermanagh.
Carrigans, County Tyrone, a townland in County Tyrone.

See also
Carrigans railway station